Raphael Riva or Raphael Ripa (died 1611) was a Roman Catholic prelate who served as Bishop of Chioggia (1610–1611) and Bishop of Korčula (1605–1610).

Biography
Raphael Riva was ordained a priest in the Order of Preachers. On 12 September 1605, he was appointed during the papacy of Pope Paul V as Bishop of Korčula.
On 24 November 1610, he was appointed during the papacy of Pope Paul V as Bishop of Chioggia. 
He served as Bishop of Chioggia until his death in 1611.

References

External links and additional sources
 (for Chronology of Bishops) 
 (for Chronology of Bishops) 
 (for Chronology of Bishops) 
 (for Chronology of Bishops) 

17th-century Roman Catholic bishops in the Republic of Venice
Bishops appointed by Pope Paul V
1611 deaths
Dominican bishops